Fortress, released in 2000, is Sister Hazel's third studio album. It produced three singles. "Change Your Mind" peaked at #59 on the US Hot 100 and at #5 on the US Adult 40, and was featured in the 2000 remake of Bedazzled starring Brendan Fraser, Elizabeth Hurley, and Frances O'Connor. "Champagne High" reached #22 on the US Adult 40, while "Beautiful Thing" failed to chart.

Track listing

Personnel
Ken Block – lead vocals, acoustic guitar
Jett Beres – bass, harmony vocals
Andrew Copeland – rhythm guitar, vocals
Ryan Newell – lead and slide guitar, harmony vocals
Mark Trojanowski – drums
Emily Saliers – background vocals on "Champagne High"

References

External links 
 http://www.freehandmusic.com/artist/sister-hazel-9260

2000 albums
Albums produced by Richie Zito
Sister Hazel albums
Universal Records albums